James McLure (born 18 September 1974) is a former Australian rules footballer who played in three games for Geelong in the Australian Football League (AFL) in 1995.

He was initially drafted to Collingwood in the AFL in the 1992 Mid Year Draft. He was delisted by Collingwood at the end of the 1993 season without having played a senior game.  He was then recruited to Geelong with a pre-draft supplementary selection in the 1994 AFL Draft.	He played in three games for Geelong in 1995, but was delisted at the end of the season. He then moved to South Australia where he played over 100 games for Woodville-West Torrens.

He has completed a PhD in clinical pharmacology. In 2010 he published a book, Eight Stones: My Journey Through Schizophrenia and Depression, outlining his life coping with schizophrenia and depression.

Bibliography

References

External links
 
 

1974 births
Living people
Australian rules footballers from Victoria (Australia)
Geelong Football Club players
Woodville-West Torrens Football Club players